Christine White may refer to:

 Christine White (actress)
 Christine White (cricketer)
 Christine White (The 10th Kingdom)